The Gulf Coast of Mexico or East Coast of Mexico stretches along the Gulf of Mexico from the border between Mexico and the United States at Matamoros, Tamaulipas  all the way to the tip of the Yucatán Peninsula at Cancún. It includes the coastal regions along the Bay of Campeche.  Major cities include Veracruz, Tampico, and Coatzacoalcos.

See also
 Pacific Coast of Mexico

References

 
Coasts of Mexico
Coasts of the Atlantic Ocean
Gulf of Mexico
Geography of Mesoamerica
Geography of Veracruz
Yucatán Peninsula